Shram Suvidha is a Web Portal to provide a single platform for all labour compliances.

India has more than 40 labour laws regulated by the Ministry of Labour and Employment, the Government of India and State Government. Compliance with these laws is tedious and time-consuming. As a result, employers often do not comply. The scale of noncompliance exceeds the ability of enforcement agencies to regulate. Amidst the confusion, employees do not always receive what they are entitled to under these laws.

Objectives
The primary objectives of Shram Suvidha are:

 A unified portal for all compliance pertaining to Chief Labour Commissioner of India, Director General Mines and Safety, Employee State Insurance Corporation, and Employee Provident Fund Organization. There are 16 laws that are covered here like Payment of Wages Act, Minimum Wages Act, Contract Labour (Abolition and Regulation) Act.
 Creation of a unique number known as the Labour Identification Number or LIN to supplement all other registration numbers such as PF Establishment Code, ESIC Registration Number, Contract Labour Registration Number, etc.
 Online servicing of notices from the labour department and online submission of answers with document.
 Employee grievances can now be received online and employer has to clear them and submit proof of clearance.

Process
Shram Suvidha allows an organization to know what labour laws apply to it.

Compliances are reportable in a single form that makes it simple for those filing such forms. Performance is monitored using key indicators thus making the evaluation process objective. It promotes the use of a common Labour Identification Number (LIN) by all Implementing agencies.

References

Indian labour law
Web portals